The Durham–Jacobs House is a house located in southwest Portland, Oregon listed on the National Register of Historic Places.

See also
 National Register of Historic Places listings in Southwest Portland, Oregon

References

Further reading

1890 establishments in Oregon
Goose Hollow, Portland, Oregon
Historic district contributing properties in Oregon
Houses completed in 1890
Houses on the National Register of Historic Places in Portland, Oregon
Portland Historic Landmarks
Queen Anne architecture in Oregon